"Mama, I'm Coming Home" is a power ballad by English heavy metal singer Ozzy Osbourne from Osbourne's sixth studio album No More Tears, which first released on 17 November 1991. The song features Osbourne on vocals, Zakk Wylde on guitar, Bob Daisley on bass, and Randy Castillo on drums. Lyrics were written by Lemmy, and the song was produced by Tom Fletcher. Two music videos were also produced to accompany the song's release.

The single is Osbourne's only solo Top 40 single on the Billboard Hot 100 chart, peaking at No. 28; his only other top 40 hits being his duet with Lita Ford, "Close My Eyes Forever", and his feature on the 2019 Post Malone song "Take What You Want", both of which peaked at number 8. It also reached number 2 on Billboards Mainstream Rock Tracks.

Background
As Zakk Wylde recalled in a 2022 interview, "I remember me and Ozzy originally did that on a piano in my apartment in North Hollywood...I transposed it to guitar when we got in the studio when we were working on the record, and then y'know it sounded great...the song started off with the pedal steel kind of thing. I mean it just sounded great...I mean everybody's performances and everything like that but I mean just the overall sound of it – the guys knocked it out of the park for sure."

Music videos
Two music videos were created for the single. The first was a surreal video that Osbourne disliked because he felt the video's plot did not match the song's concept. A second music video was then created with Samuel Bayer as its director, which subsequently augmented Osbourne's interest. Osbourne compared the effects in the second video to the hazy smoke effect seen in the video for Nirvana's "Smells Like Teen Spirit", which was also directed by Bayer.

Personnel
 Ozzy Osbourne – vocals
 Zakk Wylde – guitar
 Bob Daisley – bass
 Randy Castillo – drums
 Tom Fletcher – producer
 Lemmy Kilmister – lyrics

Reception
Stephen Thomas Erlewine of music website AllMusic called the song "a very good hard rock ballad and one of his finest singles".

Charts

Certifications

References

External links
 
 
 

Ozzy Osbourne songs
1992 singles
Songs written by Ozzy Osbourne
Hard rock ballads
Heavy metal ballads
Music videos directed by Samuel Bayer
Songs written by Lemmy
Songs written by Zakk Wylde
1991 songs
Epic Records singles
British hard rock songs